Forever: An Anthology is a 1997 Judy Collins two-CD compilation album with thirty-five songs, including three new recordings: "The Fallow Way", "Nothing Lasts Forever" and "Walls (We Are Not Forgotten)" and a re-recording of "Chelsea Morning".

Track listing

CD #1

CD #2

References

1997 compilation albums
Folk compilation albums
Judy Collins compilation albums